Terror on the Midway (1942) is the ninth of seventeen animated Technicolor short films based upon the DC Comics character of Superman, originally created by Jerry Siegel and Joe Shuster. It was the final Paramount cartoon short by Fleischer Studios. The nine-minute short features Superman attempting to stop the chaos created when several circus animals escape their cages and restraints, including a giant gorilla named Gigantic. It was originally released on August 30, 1942 by Paramount Pictures.

Plot
The story begins with the music and noise of the circus. Clark Kent and Lois Lane are at the Midway, Lois having an assignment to cover its events. She expresses her regret that she didn't have a more exciting assignment. Clark offers his condolences, then leaves for his own assignment as the show begins.

Later that night, as Lois attends the clown performance, a monkey wanders from the main tent and accidentally opens the cage of a giant gorilla (perhaps a homage to King Kong). Growling, the Gorilla named "Gigantic" wanders into the tent putting a stop in all of the acts and sending everyone into pandemonium. Circus workers attempt to tie the gorilla down with ropes, but are overpowered by its strength and are forced to flee. While other workers are struggling to keep the other animals under control, some of the elephants stampede, or rear up against their owners, knocking other cages open.

At the Daily Planet, Clark gets out of his taxicab and notices police cars driving by. He then gets back into the taxicab and tells Joe to follow the cars. Back at the circus, a lot of people are shown exiting the circus tent. Lois, who has been taking pictures of the gorilla and the fleeing attendees, is about to leave when she notices the gorilla lumbering toward a trapped young girl who emerged from the wrecked cart. She runs between the creature and the girl and helps her escape only to have the gorilla turn on her.

Clark arrives on the scene alongside the police and sees the chaos. Quickly, he changes into his Superman costume and begins returning animals like the lions and a black panther to their cages. Right after tossing an elephant into a cart, he hears a scream: Lois is trapped at the top of a pole holding up the tent and the giant gorilla is climbing perilously close. Superman confronts the gorilla and ties it down, but during the fight, one of the tent poles falls down and hits a power circuit, starting a fire. After tying the gorilla up in the net, Superman saves Lois from the flames just in time and then puts out the fire.

The final scene at the Daily Planet shows Lois vigorously typing the story, with Clark sitting lazily back in a chair at the next desk.

Voice cast 
 Bud Collyer as Clark Kent / Superman
 Joan Alexander as Lois Lane
 Jackson Beck as the Narrator
 Jack Mercer as Sideshow Barker

Gallery

References

External links
 
 
 Terror on the Midway at the Internet Archive
 Terror on the Midway at the Internet Movie Database

1942 short films
1942 animated films
1940s American animated films
1940s animated short films
1940s animated superhero films
Superman animated shorts
Fleischer Studios short films
Paramount Pictures short films
Circus films
American animated short films
American animated superhero films
Short films directed by Dave Fleischer
Animated films about gorillas